Melliana Cessy Goeslaw (born 7 January 1974) is an Indonesian singer, songwriter, composer, producer, and writer. She began singing while in the fifth grade, then began writing songs and took work as a backing vocalist for Elfa Secioria in high school. This led to her family and her moving to Jakarta to further her career. While providing backing vocals for Katon Bagaskara's promotional tour, she met Anto Hoed and Andi Ayunir. After marrying Hoed, the three formed the band Potret in 1995. Their 1995 debut album was well received, bringing Goeslaw and her bandmates to fame. , she has written over 500 songs.
 
After releasing several albums with Potret, Goeslaw attempted to begin a solo career, releasing her self-titled debut album Melly in 1999. Although Melly sold well, she became more popular as a solo artist after providing the soundtrack for the 2002 hit film Ada Apa Dengan Cinta? together with her husband. Her later releases include solo albums and soundtracks. In 2005, she released a collection of short stories to celebrate her tenth anniversary as a popular musician; four years later, she directed a concert to celebrate the bicentenary of Bandung city.

Goeslaw's onstage persona has been compared to Björk, with "eccentric" costumes, heavy make-up, and "wild" hair colours. Her early songs have been described by The Jakarta Post as being "deliberately antagonistic", with controversial themes including materialism, sadomasochism, and violence against women. Two of her songs with Potret, "Salah" and "Bunda", were selected by Rolling Stone Indonesia as some of the best Indonesian songs of all time, while her work with Ada Apa dengan Cinta? garnered her and her husband a Citra Award at the 2004 Indonesian Film Festival. However, Rolling Stone notes a decline in song quality after Ada Apa dengan Cinta?. According to The Jakarta Post, Goeslaw is one of the most sought after movie songwriters in Indonesia.

Early life 
Goeslaw was born in Bandung on 7 January 1974. She is the daughter of Melky Goeslaw, a singer and songwriter, and his wife Ersi Sukaesih.  After her parents' divorce, Goeslaw was raised by her mother; her sister Yuli, who now serves as her manager, was born from a second marriage. While in elementary school, she enjoyed writing poetry, later recalling that she "was happiest when doodling on paper, writing [her] poetry".  While she was in the fifth grade, she began singing after being convinced by her mother, who was convinced that Goeslaw could sing like her father; originally she did not want to be a singer.

She later switched to songwriting while in high school, writing lyrics on her napkins and schoolbooks and recording her humming on a Walkman because she could not play any instruments. During high school, she worked as a backing vocalist for Elfa Secioria. Her family eventually moved to Jakarta to further her singing career, and she was requested to be a backing vocalist for three different pop singers. At one point, she was recording at three different studios every day. The money that she earned convinced her to continue singing.

Career

1995–99: Potret band
After replacing a backing vocalist for Katon Bagaskara's promotional tour for the album Dinda, Goeslaw met Anto Hoed and Arie Ayunir. Aside from married with Hoed later that year, they went on to form the band Potret. The band's first album was released in 1995, with the song "Terbujuk" ("Seduced"), dealing with "the ultimate material girl", becoming instantly popular. The popular band between 1995 and 1998. While with Potret, Goeslaw wrote numerous songs. Some were written conservatively as they were ordered by singers such as Krisdayanti and Ruth Sahanaya; other songs, generally the more "biting" ones, were used for Potret's albums.

One of the songs on Potret's third album, "Diam" ("Silent"), which dealt with the abuse of women, caused some controversy due to the perceived amount of violence in the music video. Despite this controversy, it won Video Musik Indonesia's award for best interpretation of a song.

1999–2009: Solo career
In 1999, Goeslaw started her solo career with her self-titled debut album, which sold well. Her second album, the soundtrack for the 2002 teen movie Ada Apa dengan Cinta? (What's Up with Love?, literally What's Up with Cinta?), in which most songs were sung by her and written by her and her husband, led to her being more popular as a solo artist than with Potret; she was also given the nickname the Queen of Soundtrack. Its soundtrack later won Best Soundtrack at the Indonesian Film Festival.

Goeslaw later provided the soundtracks for 2003 film Eiffel... I'm in Love, 2005 film Apa Artinya Cinta? (What's the Meaning of Love?), 2007 film The Butterfly, and 2009 film Ketika Cinta Bertasbih (When Love Prays). She considered the writing of songs for Ketika Cinta Bertasbih to be more difficult than her previous work in teen romantics, as it was a religious film. As such, she felt that she had to be extra careful.

In 2005, Goeslaw released a story collection she had written to celebrate her tenth years as a singer. One of the stories, "Tentang Dia" ("About Him (or Her)"), was later filmed by Rudy Soedjarwo, the director of Ada Apa dengan Cinta?. In 2008 Goeslaw wrote and sang "Dibius Cinta" ("Drugged by Love") for the Cicakman 2: Planet Hitam (Cicakman 2: Black Planet) soundtrack with Malaysian singer and film director Yusri, from the band KRU. Goeslaw permitted to help with the scoring after watching the original Cicak Man.

After initially refusing to perform solo concerts because of creative differences with the event managers, in 2009 Goeslaw held her first concert, "Glow, Melly Live in Concert", at Senayan Stadium in Jakarta. The concert was directed by John Fair Kaune and produced by Krisdayanti's KD Productions, featured a "virtual duet" with Goeslaw's deceased father and was divided into two portions, one featuring songs from her time with Potret, and one with songs from her solo career. It also featured new songs written by Hoed especially for the concert. The following year she was head of Kampung GASS, an organising committee for a concert celebrating the 200th year since the founding of Bandung.

2010–2019: Mentoring new singers
Goeslaw is also active scouting for new singers and assisting others, having supported the careers of pop singers Irwansyah and Acha Septriasa. In 2011 she invited aspiring singers to post videos of themselves singing her songs to YouTube or her Facebook profile, later noting that she had already discovered several new talents in that manner. , she has written over 500 songs. Goeslaw released a compilation album, Balance, in January 2013.

From September through November 2015, Goeslaw became judge on La Academia Junior Indonesia for their second season.

In 2018, she provided soundtrack for Eiffel I'm in Love sequel, Eiffel... I'm in Love 2. On May, she collaborated with Hedi Yunus via "Lagu Religi" ("Religious Song"). On July, she released World Head and Neck Cancer Day-dedicated single "Cahaya dalam Cahaya" ("Lights in Lights"). Then, she also announced as collaborator of the self-written "Hara", produced by Rinaldy Yunardi. On September 6, she wrote "Bintang Di Hati" ("Stars in the Heart"), the theme song of Dancing in the Rain. This also became a theme song for television drama Samudra Cinta (Ocean of Love).

On late 2019, Goeslaw held Ada Apa Dengan Cinta? 2 Live in Concert, which includes self-written soundtracks from other films and TV series, like "Pernikahan Dini" (from Pengantin Dini), "Tegar" (from Suami, Istri dan Dia), "Hati Yang Terpilih" (from Cinta Suci), "Cinta" (from Bintang), "Cinta Sejati" (from Habibie & Ainun), "Ku Bahagia" (from Ada Apa dengan Cinta?), "Bintang Di Hati" (from Dancing in the Rain and Samudra Cinta), and "Atas Nama Cinta" (from Cinta Fitri).

Aside from its concert, she also collaborated with Rita Effendy to release Dian Pramana Poetra and Deddy Dhukun's hit "Kusadari".

2020-present 
Beginning in 2020s, Goeslaw composed song for Izellah Conelly's "Hello". Then, she released "Siap Terluka" ("Ready to be Hurt"), the soundtrack for Istri Kedua (Second Wife). In May 2020, she returned to release another religious single, "Berkumpul di Surga" ("Gathering in Heaven").

Songwriting 
Goeslaw has noted that her most popular songs are generally those which are written quickly, citing the award-winning "Menghitung Hari" ("Counting the Days"), which was written in four days, as an example. She has noted that she abandons songs which leave her with a writer's block, as even when they are finished they are not well received. Her husband does the arrangement, sometimes meaning that songs are put on hold because he is busy.

The Jakarta Post has described her lyrics as being "deliberately antagonistic", to which Goeslaw has agreed. Her songs written while with Potret include themes of materialism, sexual deviation, "misbehaving women", flatulence, and sadomasochism; she has said that she tries to avoid writing about "issues of ethnicity, religion, race and intergroup relations, especially political matters". The Jakarta Post also calls her a "deft satirist". She does not consider herself a feminist, as her songs are written about real women and not about female empowerment; she has said that her lyrics are not of the "'hear me roar' type".

Fashion 
Goeslaw is known for wearing "eccentric" costumes when performing, leading to her being compared to Icelandic singer Björk, whom she admires. She also dyed her hair in "wild colors" and applied heavy stage make up in the late 1990s, when contemporary Indonesian singers were focusing on "conventional" beauty. In 2008, Goeslaw said that her make up and hairstyles used to hide her insecurity when she was first starting. She has continued to use them because it is "part of the package", although she now discusses ideas with her creative team.

Awards and recognition 
Goeslaw's songs have won awards. In the first Indonesian Film Festival (after the festival's twelve-year hiatus between 1992 and 2004), Goeslaw and her husband won Best Soundtrack for their work in Ada Apa Dengan Cinta?; it was one of three awards won by the movie at the festival, which covered films from 2002 to 2004. The Jakarta Post calls her Indonesia's most sought after movie songwriter, and notes that her songs have been successfully covered by other singers. Her work as a songwriter has led to her becoming an active proponent of intellectual property.

In 2009, Rolling Stone Indonesia listed two songs that Goeslaw performed while with Potret in its list of the 150 Best Indonesian Songs of All Time, both of which were from the album Potret II. "Salah" ("Wrong") was ranked 74th, being noted as the best example of Goeslaw's "freshly, directly, and often provocative styles" when writing songs and writing that her "sweet" vocals challenged the paradigm that a singer singing about an affair should be either a victim or full of revenge. The other song, "Bunda" ("Mother") was ranked at 110; it was noted being capable of making anyone, "even the most cruel man", pause for a moment to think of their mother. Rolling Stone Indonesia noted a decrease in the quality of Goeslaw's songs since Ada Apa Dengan Cinta?.

Personal life 
Goeslaw is a devout Muslim throughout her life, and married to guitarist Anto Hoed. They have two children, Anakku Lelaki "Ale" Hoed and Pria Bernama "Abe" Hoed (literally My Son Hoed and Man Named Hoed). In her spare time she enjoys shopping, playing with her children, and internet browsing; she has stated that she finds it increasingly difficult to enjoy shopping due to being constantly recognised. She has stated that she prefers being backstage over giving concerts, as she does not have to wear make-up or rehearse.

Discography

Albums
 Pilihanku Deritaku (1988) – listed as Meliana Cessy
 Melly (1999)
 Ada Apa dengan Cinta? (OST; 2002)
 Eiffel I'm in Love (OST; 2003)
 Intuisi (2005)
 Apa Artinya Cinta? (OST; 2005)
 Mind 'N Soul (2007)
 The Butterfly (OST; 2008)
 Ketika Cinta Bertasbih (2009)
 Glow (2009)
 Dancing in the Silence (2011)
 Queen of Soundtrack (2013)
 Ada Apa dengan Cinta? 2 (OST; 2016)

Singles
 Apa Kata Dunia? (duet with Deddy Mizwar; 2007)
 Catatanku (duet with Baim; 2009)
 Jika Aku Menjadi (Soundtrack album from Jika Aku Menjadi reality show on Trans TV; 2010)
 Demi Cinta (Di Bawah Lindungan Ka'bah soundtrack album; 2011)
 Cinta Suci Zahrana (Cinta Suci Zahrana soundtrack album, duet with Anto Hoed; 2012)
 Cinta & Ibadah (Cinta & Ibadah soundtrack album; 2014)
 Promise (Promise soundtrack album) (2017)
 Memang Kenapa Bila Aku Perempuan? (Kartini soundtrack album, duet with Gita Gutawa; 2017)
 Bintang Di Hati (Dancing in the Rain and Samudra Cinta soundtrack album; 2018–2019)
 Kusadari (duet with Rita Effendy; 2019)
 Siap Terluka (Istri Kedua soundtrack album; 2020)
 Berkumpul Di Surga (2020)

Filmography 
 Kabayan Jadi Milyuner (2010)
 Milly & Mamet (2018)

Notes

References 

Footnotes

Bibliography

  Songs discussed on pages 74 and 88.

External links
 

1974 births
Living people
Maya Award winners
21st-century Indonesian women singers
Indonesian pop singers
People from Bandung
Citra Award winners
Anugerah Musik Indonesia winners
Indonesian songwriters
Converts to Islam from Protestantism
Indonesian former Christians
Indonesian Muslims
20th-century Indonesian women singers